Euchontha memor is a moth of the family Notodontidae first described by William Warren in 1904. It is found in Peru.

References

Moths described in 1904
Notodontidae of South America